Rhynchaenus is a genus of beetles alternatively placed in the subfamilies Rhynchaeninae or in Curculioninae, of family Curculionidae. It previously included the genus Orchestes, but is now restricted to a smaller group of species, all of which occur in Europe, Japan, or North Africa and feed on Asteraceae plants. Reports of its occurrence in North America are erroneous.

Species 
A large number of species have been assigned under the Rhynchaenus genera although some species originally assigned to Rhynchaenus now belong in a different genera

References

Literature cited 
 Anderson, R.S. 1989. Revision of the subfamily Rhynchaeninae in North America (Coleoptera: Curculionidae) (subscription required). Transactions of the American Entomological Society 115(3):207–312.
 Anderson, R.S., O'Brien, C.W., Salsbury, G.A. and Krauth, S.J. 2007. Orchestes alni (L.) newly discovered in North America (Coleoptera: Curculionidae) (subscription required). Journal of the Kansas Entomological Society 80(1):78–79.

Further reading 
 Uber die Russelkaferarten der Gattung Stenocarus Thoms. und Rhynchaenus Clairv. (Coleoptera, Curculionidae).
 Revision of the Japanese species of Chrysocharis (Hymenoptera, Eulophidae), 1.
 Hyponomological fauna of Slovenia. 25.
 The weevils of Kansas: a manual for identification.
 Digital-Weevil-Determination of West Palaearctic: Isochnus/Orchestes/Pseudorchestes/Rhamphus/Rhynchaenus/Tachyerges (Curculioninae: Rhamphini).

External links 

Curculioninae
Beetles of Europe